Javier Alberto González Barrera (born 13 November 1979 in Sogamoso) is a Colombian former professional cyclist, best known for winning the 2006 Clásico RCN.

Major results

2003
1st Stage 2 Clásico RCN
2006
1st Overall Clásico RCN
1st Stage 3
1st Stage 3 Doble Sucre Potosí GP Cemento Fancesa
 Vuelta a Colombia
1st Stages 3 & 10
1st Stage 5 Doble Copacabana Grand Prix Fides
2007
2nd Overall Clásico RCN
1st Stage 3
2008
1st Stage 3 Clásico RCN
2010
1st Stage 13 Vuelta a Colombia

References

External links

1979 births
Living people
Colombian male cyclists
People from Sogamoso
Sportspeople from Boyacá Department
21st-century Colombian people